A mammisi (mamisi) is an ancient Egyptian small chapel attached to a larger temple (usually in front of the pylons), built from the Late Period, and associated with the nativity of a god. The word is derived from Coptic – the last phase of the ancient Egyptian language – meaning "birth place". Its usage is attributed to the French egyptologist Jean-François Champollion (1790–1832).

Religious references 
Major temples inhabited by a divine triad could be completed by a peristyle-surrounded mammisi, in which the goddess of the triad would give birth to the son of the triad itself. The son, whose divine birth was celebrated annually, was associated with the Pharaoh (even in the hierogamy scenes on the walls). 

Taweret, Raet-Tawy and the Seven Hathors who presided over childbirth were particularly revered here, but it is equally common to find references to Bes, Khnum and Osiris himself as fertility deities. Mammisis thus formed an architectural translation of the myth of divine birth and its eternal repetition. From the end of the Late Period these buildings confirm the restoration of royal power that each dynasty will strive to assert in the very heart of the great sanctuaries of the country,  including the Roman emperors.

Notable Mammisi

Dendera 

The most important surviving examples in Dendera, Edfu, Kom Ombo, Philae, El Kab, Athribis, Armant, the Dakhla Oasis etc. are from the Ptolemaic and Roman periods in Egypt; but the first one, in Dendera, dates back to the 30th dynasty Pharaoh Nectanebo I (379/378–361/360 BC), one of the last native rulers of Egypt. Equipped with a hypostyle by Pharaoh Ptolemy VI Philometor (181–145 BC) and with a peristyle by Ptolemy X Alexander I (110–88 BC), it was dedicated to Harsiese ("Horus son of Isis"). This 30th dynasty project was then repeated, by the Græco-Roman rulers, for some of the major shrines in the country.

The famous Roman mammisi – the less ancient one associated with the Dendera Temple complex – was built by Augustus immediately after his conquest of Egypt (31 BC). The murals show Augustus' far successor Trajan at the sacrificial ceremony for Hathor and are among the most beautiful in Egypt. The mammisi was dedicated to Hathor and her child Ihy. On the abacus above the pillar capitals are representations of Bes as the patron god of birth.

References

Further reading 

 Alexander Badawy: The Architectural Symbolism of the Mammisi-Chapels in Egypt. In: Chronique d'Égypte. Vol. 38, 1933, p. 87–90.
 Ludwig Borchardt: Ägyptische Tempel mit Umgang. Cairo 1938.
 François Daumas: Les mammisis des temples égyptiens. Paris 1958.
 Francois Daumas: Geburtshaus, in: Lexikon der Ägyptologie. Vol. II, p. 462–475.
 Sandra Sandri: Har-Pa-Chered (Harpokrates): Die Genese eines ägyptischen Götterkindes. Peeters, Leuven 2006, .
 Daniela Rutica: Kleopatras vergessener Tempel. Das Geburtshaus von Kleopatra VII. in Hermonthis. Eine Rekonstruktion der Dekoration (= Göttinger Miszellen. Occasional Studies Vol. 1). Georg-August-Universität Göttingen, Seminar für Ägyptologie und Koptologie, Göttingen 2015, .

Egyptology
Sacral architecture
Ancient Egyptian architecture
Architectural elements
Types of monuments and memorials